Grant Township is a township in Guthrie County, Iowa, United States.

The township had a population of 261 in 2000, and 188 in 2020. The township's German citizens were reported to be very loyal to the United States during World War I.

References

Townships in Guthrie County, Iowa
Townships in Iowa